Andy Martin (1963 -) is an Australian architect and designer based in London, England and the director of Andy Martin Architects. Known for his use of light and dark space, natural light and playful materials, his work ranges from furniture and product design to restaurant, bar, and residential interior design. He also lectures on architecture and design, serves as a university studio critic, and is a board member for civic institutions and jury awards programs.

Biography 

Andy Martin was born in Sydney. He studied architecture at the University of Technology and completed his initial training at the Architectural Association School of Architecture in London. Whilst practicing architecture, Martin continued to develop his skills as a furniture designer, being the first to integrate his experience of surfboard design with furniture and sculptural forms.

Martin moved to Paris in 1992 where he began working with Marc Newson on several interior projects. It was through this partnership and collaborations on Coast restaurant London, and Mash & Air Manchester, that Martin developed his interest in restaurant design. Martin's client on these projects was the restaurateur Oliver Peyton. Striking up a relationship with Peyton, Martin was appointed as Concept Architect for the flagship Mash 02 restaurant in London. Mash 02 itself responded to a more refined view of the concept started with Mash & Air, with the design becoming more iconic, more essential, and hence, easily transposable to future Mash sites.

After winning an architectural competition in 1999, competing against prominent architecture firms including Zaha Hadid, Martin was asked to design the Isola restaurant in London. This next major project undertaken showed the practice actively shape and change the UK’s bar and restaurant culture, through its refined, mature and yet still playful style. After the success of this restaurant Martin formed a new practice, Andy Martin Architects, in which he took on director Tom Davies who came to the company as a Project Manager.  Since AMA was set up, Martin has moved on to design many residential properties, including the Olga Polizzi and William Shawcross residence in West London. AMA continues to design restaurants and bars around London and have been working on projects in Hong Kong, Saudi Arabia, California and Greece.

Works 

Restaurant Design
 Mash 02, 1998
 Mash 03, 2000
 Isola, 2000
 The Admiralty at Somerset House, 2001
 L'etranger, 2003
 Barrafina, 2006
 Hereford Road, 2007
 Quo Vadis, 2008
 Chan Restaurant 2011
 L'etranger, 2012
 Villa Zevaco, 2012
Andy Martin Workshop
 Crescent Pearl, 1989
 Pancreas, 1989
 Grubb Lounge, 1991
 Plug Bucket, 1997
 Weinerchaise, 2009
 Gridspace, 2012
 The Undergraduate Shelving, 2012
 Villa Zevaco Lamp, 2012

Books 

Modernism and Modernization in Architecture, Academy Editions, 1999, p 49, 52, 53
   
Sci-Fi Architecture, AD Magazine, Vol69 No3/4, March–April 1999, p 54, 55

Interior Spaces of Europe Vol. 2, The Images Publishing Group, 1999, p112, 113

Caffe e Ristoranti, Frederico Motta Editore, September 2000, p118-132

Cool Shops London, teNeues Publishing 2005, p10, 11

New Bar and Club Design, Laurence King 2005, p32, 33 and p84, 85

Awards 

Winner Best Interior Design, Time Out Eating & Drinking Awards 2000

Winner Best New Restaurant, Evening Standard Restaurant Awards 2001

Winner New Bar Design, Theme Magazine Bar Awards 2003

Winner Restaurant & Bar Design Awards, Best lighting, Chan restaurant, 2011

References

External links 

 
 
 

Australian designers
Living people
1963 births
Restaurant design
Architects from London